Casey James Kenney (born March 20, 1991) is an American mixed martial artist. He is currently competing in the Bantamweight division in the Ultimate Fighting Championship (UFC) and he was the former Tachi Palace Fights Flyweight champion and Legacy Fighting Alliance Flyweight and Bantamweight champion.

Background 
Kenney was born in 1991 to Brian Kenney and Roxanne Mosier in Portland. He started training judo at the age of five, eventually becoming nine-time national champion and holds 2nd dan black belt in the sport. Besides judo, Kenney started wrestling around the time he went to school. Like in judo, Kenney excelled in wrestling too, winning multiple state championships in both freestyle and Greco-Roman wrestling.

Kenney attended Jay County High School in Indiana. After high school, he took his first amateur mixed martial arts bout on a whim without prior training. He went to study at University of Indianapolis, only to drop out after sophomore year to pursue his career in mixed martial arts. In an effort to do so, Kenney moved to Tucson to train at the MMA Lab in Glendale, Ariz. and turned professional in late 2014.

Mixed martial arts career

Early career 
Kenney fought most of his early professional fights primarily in the Tachi Palace Fights and Dragon House in California and Arizona. After amassing a record of 6-0 and captured the Tachi Palace Flyweight title against Alvin Cacdac, Kenney made two appearances in Dana White's Contender Series web-series program on July 18, 2017, facing C.J. Hamilton at  Dana White's Contender Series 2, where he won the fight via unanimous decision, but lost to Adam Antolin at Dana White's Contender Series 8 on August 29, 2017. Kenney went on to fought under Legacy Fighting Alliance for the next four fights and he became the Flyweight and Bantamweight Legacy Fighting  Alliance champion prior signed with UFC.

Ultimate Fighting Championship 
In his UFC debut, Kenney faced Ray Borg, replacing Kyler Phillips in six day notice, on March 30, 2019 at UFC on ESPN 2. At the weigh-ins, Borg weighed in at 137.75 lbs, 1.75 pound over the bantamweight non-title fight limit of 136 lbs. He was fined 20% of his fight purse and his bout against Kenney proceeded at catchweight. Kenney won the fight via unanimous decision.

On December 29, 2018, Kenney faced Manny Bermudez on August 17, 2019 at UFC 241. However, the UFC decided to move the bout to a catchweight bout of 140 lbs. due to the fighters cutting substantial weight the night before weigh-ins. Kenney won the bout via unanimous decision.

Kenney faced Merab Dvalishvili on February 15, 2020 at UFC Fight Night 167. He lost the fight by unanimous decision.

Kenney faced Louis Smolka on May 30, 2020 at UFC on ESPN: Woodley vs. Burns. He won the fight via a submission through a guillotine choke in round one.

Kenney was expected to face Alateng Heili on September 27, 2020 at UFC 253. However, due to unknown reasons, it was moved to UFC on ESPN: Holm vs. Aldana on October 4, 2020. He won the fight via unanimous decision.

Kenny faced Nathaniel Wood on October 24, 2020 at UFC 254. He won the back-and-forth fight via unanimous decision. This fight earned him the Fight of the Night award.

Kenney faced former WEC and UFC Bantamweight Champion Dominick Cruz at UFC 259 on March 6, 2021. He lost the fight via split decision.

Kenney faced Song Yadong on August 7, 2021 at UFC 265. He lost the fight via split decision.

Championships and accomplishments

Mixed martial arts
Ultimate Fighting Championship
Fight of the Night (One time) 
 Tachi Palace Fights
Tachi Palace Fights Flyweight Champion (One time)
 Legacy Fighting Alliance 
Legacy Fighting Alliance interim Flyweight Champion (One time)
Legacy Fighting Alliance interim Bantamweight Champion (One time)
MMAjunkie.com
2020 October Fight of the Month

Mixed martial arts record 

|-
|Loss
|align=center|16–4–1
|Song Yadong
|Decision (split)
|UFC 265
|
|align=center|3
|align=center|5:00
|Houston, Texas, United States
|
|-
|Loss
|align=center|16–3–1
|Dominick Cruz
|Decision (split)
|UFC 259
|
|align=center|3
|align=center|5:00
|Las Vegas, Nevada, United States
|
|-
|Win
|align=center|16–2–1
|Nathaniel Wood
|Decision (unanimous)
|UFC 254
|
|align=center|3
|align=center|5:00
|Abu Dhabi, United Arab Emirates
|
|-
|Win
|align=center|15–2–1
|Alateng Heili
|Decision (unanimous)
|UFC on ESPN: Holm vs. Aldana
|
|align=center|3
|align=center|5:00
|Abu Dhabi, United Arab Emirates
|
|-
|Win
|align=center|
|Louis Smolka
|Submission (guillotine choke)
|UFC on ESPN: Woodley vs. Burns
|
|align=center|1
|align=center|3:03
|Las Vegas, Nevada, United States
|
|-
|Loss
|align=center|13–2–1
|Merab Dvalishvili
|Decision (unanimous)
|UFC Fight Night: Anderson vs. Błachowicz 2
|
|align=center|3
|align=center|5:00
|Rio Rancho, New Mexico, United States
|
|-
|Win
|align=center|13–1–1
|Manny Bermudez
|Decision (unanimous)
|UFC 241
|
|align=center|3
|align=center|5:00
|Anaheim, California, United States
|
|-
|Win
|align=center|12–1–1
|Ray Borg
|Decision (unanimous)
|UFC on ESPN: Barboza vs. Gaethje
|
|align=center|3
|align=center|5:00
|Philadelphia, Pennsylvania, United States
|
|-
|Win
|align=center|11–1–1
|Vince Cachero
|KO (knee)
|LFA 62
|
|align=center|1
|align=center|1:38
|Dallas, Texas, United States
|
|-
|Win
|align=center|10–1–1
|Brandon Royval
|Decision (unanimous)
|LFA 53
|
|align=center|5
|align=center|5:00
|Phoenix, Arizona, United States
|
|-
|Win
|align=center|9–1–1
|Roman Salazar
|Decision (unanimous)
|LFA 44
|
|align=center|3
|align=center|5:00
|Phoenix, Arizona, United States
|
|-
|Win
|align=center|8–1–1
|Kendrick Latchman
|Decision (unanimous)
|LFA 31
|
|align=center|3
|align=center|5:00
|Phoenix, Arizona, United States
|
|-
|Loss
|align=center|7–1–1
|Adam Antolin
|Decision (split)
|Dana White's Contender Series 8
|
|align=center|3
|align=center|5:00
|Las Vegas, Nevada, United States
|
|-
|Win
|align=center|7–0–1
|C.J. Hamilton
|Decision (unanimous)
|Dana White's Contender Series 2
|
|align=center|3
|align=center|5:00
|Las Vegas, Nevada, United States
|
|-
|Draw
|align=center|6–0–1
|Bruno Gustavo da Silva
|Draw (split)
|LFA 11
|
|align=center|3
|align=center|5:00
|Phoenix, Arizona, United States
|
|-
|Win
|align=center|6–0
|Alvin Cacdac
|Submission (rear-naked choke)
|TPF 30
|
|align=center|1
|align=center|4:09
|Lemoore, California, United States
|
|-
|Win
|align=center|5–0
|Rafael Angel Hernandez
|Submission (brabo choke)
|TPF 27
|
|align=center|1
|align=center|3:44
|Lemoore, California, United States
|
|-
|Win
|align=center|4–0
|Anthony Torres
|Submission (armbar)
|TPF 26
|
|align=center|1
|align=center|1:48
|Lemoore, California, United States
|
|-
|Win
|align=center|3–0
|Victor Rosas
|TKO (doctor stoppage)
|TPF 25
|
|align=center|3
|align=center|4:31
|Lemoore, California, United States
|
|-
|Win
|align=center|2–0
|Paul Amaro
|Decision (unanimous)
|Dragon House 20
|
|align=center|3
|align=center|5:00
|San Francisco, California, United States
|
|-
|Win
|align=center|1–0
|Elijah Muhammad
|Submission (rear-naked choke)
|Duel for Domination 10
|
|align=center|2
|align=center|2:26
|Mesa, Arizona, United States
|
|-

See also 
 List of current UFC fighters
 List of male mixed martial artists

References

External links 
 
  

1991 births
Living people
American male mixed martial artists
Sportspeople from Arizona
Mixed martial artists from California
Bantamweight mixed martial artists
Mixed martial artists utilizing judo
Mixed martial artists utilizing freestyle wrestling
Mixed martial artists utilizing Greco-Roman wrestling
Mixed martial artists utilizing Brazilian jiu-jitsu
Ultimate Fighting Championship male fighters
American male judoka
American male sport wrestlers
American practitioners of Brazilian jiu-jitsu
People awarded a black belt in Brazilian jiu-jitsu